Carterhaugh is a wood and farm near the confluence of the Yarrow Water and the Ettrick Water near Selkirk in the Scottish Borders. This real location is the fictional setting for the meeting between Tam Lin and Janet (sometimes Margaret) in the ballad "Tam Lin".

References

Yarrow Valley